Spiraeeae is a tribe of the rose family, Rosaceae, belonging to the subfamily Amygdaloideae.

References

External links  

 
Rosales tribes